Wicket or wicket ball was an American form of cricket played up until the 1800s.

George Washington played it once with his soldiers.

Rules 
Wicket used a wicket which was much wider and shorter than a cricket wicket, and a bat that resembled a spoon. There were up to 30 fielders and 3 innings, making the game finish in a day.

The creases that batters had to run across to score runs were called "Tick Marks", scoring a run (which happened when the batters crossed each other running to the other wicket) could be called a "cross", and the cricket pitch where the ball was bowled was called an alley. Run outs were known as "ticking [out]" the batter. In some forms of wicket, a batter could be out LBW if the ball hit them on the body (known as a "sham" or "shinning") thrice under certain circumstances.

References

External links
 Chronology:Wicket - Protoball

Forms of cricket